Suzana Amaral Rezende (March 28, 1932 – June 25, 2020) was a Brazilian film director and screenwriter. She was best known for the 1985 film A Hora da Estrela (Hour of the Star).

Career
Amaral's film career started at the age of 37 when she entered the University of São Paulo film school. After graduating, she taught at the University for three years and began working for Radio and Television Cultura. In her 14-year career at Radio and Television Cultura she produced approximately 50 documentaries, films, and plays for the station. In 1976 she moved to New York to pursue a degree in film from the Tisch School of the Arts at  New York University. She completed this degree and graduated in 1978.

A Hora da Estrela
Amaral's first feature film and best known work, A Hora da Estrela (Hour of the Star) was released in 1985. Based on the novel of the same name by Clarice Lispector, the film focuses on the life of a troubled young protagonist, Macabéa (Marcélia Cartaxo), living in São Paulo. According to film critic Nissa Torrents, "the film upsets many stereotypes in its presentation of the female protagonist, who is neither beautiful nor middle-class. An anti-heroine, starved of affection and respect, she wanders through life looking for an image she can adopt and adapt."
The film was well received at its release and was a Submission to the 59th Academy Awards for Best Foreign Language Film. Additionally, it was entered into the 36th Berlin International Film Festival, where actress Marcélia Cartaxo won the Silver Bear for Best Actress. At the 1985 Brasilia Film Festival the film won best picture and Amaral won best director. Additionally, the film also won best picture at the 1986 Havana Film Festival. Amaral was chosen as best director at the 1986 International Woman's Film Festival. A Hora da Estrela was shot in four weeks on a budget of $150,000, 70% of which was funded by Embrafilme. The success of A Hora da Estrela led Amaral to immediate notoriety, though none of her other films have achieved such success.

Personal life
Amaral had nine children, one of which was born while she was pursuing her film studies in São Paulo. She has said that she was "totally dedicated to motherhood for 10 years" before deciding to pursue her dream of filmmaking. She was divorced.
Amaral was an avid follower of Bollywood films who said she wanted Indian films to come to Brazil in a big way. Amaral was a Buddhist.

Filmography

References

Further reading
 Foster, Gwendolyn Audrey. Women Film Directors: An International Bio-Critical Dictionary. Westport, Conn: Greenwood Press, 1995.
 Foster, Gwendolyn Audrey, Katrien Jacobs, and Amy L. Unterburger, eds. Women Filmmakers & Their Films. Detroit: St. James Press, 1998.

External links

Suzana Amaral on FilmDirectorsSite.com

1932 births
2020 deaths
University of São Paulo alumni
Tisch School of the Arts alumni
Brazilian women film directors
20th-century Brazilian women writers
Brazilian Buddhists
Brazilian screenwriters
People from São Paulo
Brazilian women screenwriters
21st-century Brazilian women writers
21st-century Brazilian writers
Road incident deaths in Brazil